The People's Democratic Party was a political party in Chile. It was founded through a split in the Democratic Party. PDP was part of the 1952 People's Alliance that supported Carlos Ibáñez del Campo in the 1952 presidential election. In 1956 the PDP joined the Popular Action Front (FRAP). In 1956 PDP merged again into the Democratic Party.

References

Political parties established in 1948
Political parties disestablished in 1956
Defunct political parties in Chile
1960 disestablishments in Chile